Teima Onorio (also as Teimwa) (born 1963) is an I-Kiribati politician who has been a Member of the House of Assembly since 1998. She served as Vice President of Kiribati from 2003 to 2016.

Early life
Onorio is the daughter of Rota Onorio, president of Council of State and acting President of Kiribati from 10 December 1982 until 18 February 1983. She was educated at Victoria University of Wellington (BA) and the University of East Anglia (MA, 1990).

Career
Onorio served as Member of Parliament for the Arorae constituency from 1998 to 2002. She has also held the post of Minister for Internal and Social Affairs since 2012. She was Minister for Education, Youth and Sports Development from 2003 to 2007, before heading the Ministry of Commerce, Industry and Cooperatives from 2007 to 2008 and then returning to Education, Youth and Sports Development from 2008 to 2012.

As Vice-President of Kiribati, she has represented the Alliance of Small Island States at the United Nations, speaking on the topic of climate change.

President Anote Tong reappointed Onorio to a third consecutive term as Vice President on 19 January 2012, as part of his cabinet appointees.

References

1963 births
Living people
Vice-presidents of Kiribati
Members of the House of Assembly (Kiribati)
Pillars of Truth politicians
Victoria University of Wellington alumni
Alumni of the University of East Anglia
20th-century I-Kiribati women politicians
20th-century I-Kiribati politicians
21st-century I-Kiribati women politicians
21st-century I-Kiribati politicians
Women vice presidents
Women government ministers of Kiribati
Education ministers of Kiribati
Industry ministers of Kiribati
Sports ministers of Kiribati
Trade ministers of Kiribati
Youth ministers of Kiribati